HMS Namur was a 90-gun second rate ship of the line of the Royal Navy, launched at Woolwich Dockyard in 1697.

On 11 June 1723 she was ordered to be taken to pieces at Portsmouth and her timbers transferred to Deptford Dockyard. In 1729 the timbers were used to rebuild the ship according to the 1719 Establishment.

She was rebuilt by Richard Stacey at Deptford Dockyard and relaunched on 13 September 1729. In 1745, she was razeed to 74 guns.

In February 1744 she took part in the Battle of Toulon.

Namur was wrecked on 14 April 1749 in a storm near Fort St David on the east coast of India. In total, 520 of her crew were drowned, though Captain Marshal survived.

Commanders of Note 

Edward Falkingham 1731/2
George Clinton 1732 to 1734
John Barnsley
Thomas Whitney
Samuel Faulknor
Samuel Cornish
George Berkeley

Flagship of 

Admiral Charles Wager
Rear Admiral Nicholas Haddock
Admiral John Norris
Vice Admiral Thomas Matthews

Notes

References 
 
 
 

Ships of the line of the Royal Navy
1690s ships
Maritime incidents in 1749